The Almohad Caliphate launched a major offensive against the Kingdom of Portugal in the spring of 1190 that lasted into the summer of 1191. The Caliph Yaʿqūb al-Manṣūr crossed over from Africa to take personal command of his forces. The campaign of 1190 was underwhelming because of assistance Portugal received from passing armies of the Third Crusade. The sieges of Tomar, Santarém and Silves had to be abandoned, but the caliph overwintered in Seville. The campaign of 1191 reversed Portugal's recent reconquistas (reconquests), captured Silves after a second siege and pushed the frontier north to the Tagus.

1190 expedition

Yaʿqūb al-Manṣūr spent most of 1188–1189 preparing an expedition against Portugal. In September 1189, Silves was captured by King Sancho I of Portugal with help from some crusaders on their way to join the siege of Acre. In April 1190, al-Manṣūr finally launched his invasion. The Bayān al-mughrib of Ibn ʿIdhārī reports that around this time he defeated a fleet of northern crusaders near the Strait of Gibraltar, capturing many and receiving praise from the poets.

In al-Andalus (Iberia), the caliph was joined by forces from Seville and Granada. In June, he laid siege to Silves. In July, the Almohad navy joined the siege. The caliph, however, left operations in the hands of local troops and took most of his expeditionary force to Córdoba. His cousin, al-Sayyid Yaḥyā ibn ʿUmar, was left in command at Silves.

At Córdoba, the caliph met an embassy from King Alfonso VIII of Castile, with whom he signed a truce, freeing himself to concentrate on Portugal. From Córdoba, al-Manṣūr launched an invasion of the Alentejo. The town of Torres Novas surrendered. Its defenders were given their liberty, but the town was razed. The caliph then marched on Tomar, which was being held by the Knights Templar. His main objective, however, was Santarém.

At this juncture, two groups of crusaders made landfall in Portugal. At Silves, a single ship carrying about 100 English crusaders separated from its fleet by a storm arrived in Silves amid great confusion. Bishop Nicholas begged them to take part in the city's defence, while the citizens scuttled their ship. After they were promised a replacement ship, they agreed to join the defence. The other nine ships of the fleet landed at Lisbon while King Sancho was preparing to march in defence of Santarém. According to Roger of Hoveden, 500 crusaders agreed to join the king. With their arrival, Sancho rebuffed al-Manṣūr's offer of a seven-year truce, which would have required surrendering Silves. The king took up a position in Santarém, which came under siege. Facing stronger resistance than anticipated, the caliph abandoned Tomar and Santarém and retreated south. The siege of Tomar had lasted five days. In retreat, Torres Novas was burned.

While Sancho and the 500 crusaders were marching south, a further 63 English ships arrived in Lisbon. Rioting broke out between the crusaders and the city's Jewish and Muslim inhabitants. Sancho returned to restore order, but in a few days rioting broke out anew. Some 700 crusaders were arrested. The ships left Lisbon on 24 July.

After falling ill, al-Manṣūr decided to break off the siege of Silves, whose attackers were running short on supplies in any case. He retreated with his army to Seville, where he wintered.

1191 expedition
In April 1191, al-Manṣūr launched a second attempt to reconquer Silves. He first endeavoured to take Alcácer do Sal by force, before settling down to a siege. The defenders soon capitulated on terms and were given their liberty. Unliked Torres Novas, which he had razed, Alcácer do Sal was garrisoned by the caliph and placed under the command of Muḥammad ibn Sı̄dray ibn Wazı̄r. For its upkeep, the caliph designated certain funds from Ceuta and Seville.

After Alcácer do Sal, the towns Palmela,  and Almada were quickly captured. Leiria was destroyed and the Almohads raided as far north as the environs of Coimbra. The castle of Alvor, whose population had been massacred in 1189, was retaken. For his second siege of Silves, al-Manṣūr brought four times as many siege engines as the defenders had. In late June, he launched an assault on Silves and breached the walls. The defenders retreated into the citadel and were besieged. With the king's permission, they surrendered on 25 July and were allowed to leave. After signing a five-year truce with Sancho, al-Manṣūr returned to Africa. He had pushed the border north as far as the Tagus, leaving Portugal only one significant fortress to its south, at Évora.

Silves was taken and partially destroyed by the German Crusade of 1197, but it remained in Almohad hands.

Notes

Bibliography

12th century in Portugal
Sieges involving the Almohad Caliphate
Battles of the Third Crusade
1190 in Europe
1191 in Europe
Conflicts in 1190
Conflicts in 1191
Silves, Portugal